The following aviators from the British Empire were credited with five or more aerial victories during World War I. This list is complete.

20 or more victories (83 names)

 Billy Bishop
 Edward "Mick" Mannock
 Raymond Collishaw
 James McCudden
 Andrew Beauchamp-Proctor
 Donald MacLaren
 William George Barker
 Robert A. Little
 George McElroy
 Roderic Dallas
 Albert Ball
 Tom F. Hazell
 Philip F. Fullard
 Charles George Gass
 John Inglis Gilmour
 William Lancelot Jordan
 Alfred Atkey
 William Gordon Claxton
 James Ira Thomas Jones
 Joseph Stewart Temple Fall
 Frederick McCall
 Henry Winslow Woollett
 Frank Granger Quigley
 Geoffrey Hilton Bowman
 Samuel Kinkead
 Andrew Edward McKeever
 Charles Dawson Booker
 Percy Jack Clayson
 Harry Cobby
 Leonard Henry Rochford
 Albert Desbrisay Carter
 John Everard Gurdon
 Reginald Hoidge
 Dennis Latimer
 Clifford McEwen
 Thomas Percy Middleton
 Frank Ormond Soden
 Arthur Whealy
 Ronald Malcolm Fletcher
 William Frederick James Harvey
 Elwyn King
 Gerald Joseph Constable Maxwell
 William Ernest Staton
 William McKenzie Thomson
 Keith Caldwell
 Robert J. O. Compston
 Stanley Wallace Rosevear
 Peter Carpenter
 George S. L. Hayward
 Harry G. E. Luchford
 Tom Cecil Noel
 William Ernest Shields
 James Anderson Slater
 William Melville Alexander
 William Charles Campbell
 Mathew Brown Frew
 Howard Percy Lale
 Alexander Pentland
 Harold Whistler
 Thomas Sinclair Harrison
 Louis Fleeming Jenkin
 Cecil Frederick King
 Arthur Ernest Newland
 Benjamin Roxburgh-Smith
 Joseph Leonard Maries White
 Francis Cubbon
 Harold Leslie Edwards
 Charles Hickey
 William John Charles Kennedy-Cochran-Patrick
 Richard Maybery
 Richard Minifie
 George Edwin Thomson
 Leonard Monteagle Barlow
 Douglas John Bell
 Kenneth Burns Conn
 Edgar Johnston
 Camille Lagesse
 Ian Donald Roy McDonald
 Keith Park
 Charles G. Ross
 Walter Southey
 Frederick Thayre
 Arthur Rhys-Davids
 Francis Warrington Gillet

15-19 victories (62 names)

 Horace Barton
 Wilfred Beaver
 Andrew Cowper
 Arthur Bradfield Fairclough
 Cedric Howell
 Leslie Powell
 Arthur Reed
 Ellis Vair Reid
 Alan Wilkinson
 George Chisholm MacKay
 William Molesworth
 Maurice Newnham
 John Todd
 John Lightfoot Trollope
 Ronald Bannerman
 Alfred Williams Carter
 Carl Frederick Falkenberg
 George Everard Gibbons
 Fred Parkinson Holliday
 Reginald Makepeace
 John Pinder
 Edwin Swale
 Edmund Tempest
 Walter Tyrrell
 Owen Baldwin
 Gerald Gordon Bell
 Henry John Burden
 John Stanley Chick
 John Cowell
 Bruce Digby-Worsley
 Stearne Tighe Edwards
 Ernest Elton
 Robert Foster
 Robert Grosvenor
 Allan Hepburn
 Sidney Highwood
 Frank Johnson
 Oliver Redgate
 Francis Smith
 David Stewart
 Christoffel Venter
 Anthony Wall
 Lawrence Coombes
 Cyril Crowe
 Charles Cudemore
 Ralph Curtis
 Ernest Deighton
 George Gates
 James Alpheus Glen
 Harry King Goode
 John Rutherford Gordon
 John Edmund Greene
 Edwin Hayne
 Frank Hobson
 John Jones
 Andrew Kiddie
 Harold Mellings
 Alfred Mills
 Roy Cecil Phillipps
 Herbert Richardson
 Harold Stackard
 Frank Weare

11-14 victories (157 names)

 Colin Brown
 Carleton Main Clement
 Arthur Coningham
 Euan Dickson
 Charles Findlay
 Maxwell Findlay
 James Fitz-Morris
 Frank George Gibbons
 Albert Earl Godfrey
 Frank Gorringe
 Arthur Keen
 Ronald T. Mark
 Maurice Mealing
 Walter Naylor
 James Dennis Payne
 William Sidebottom
 John Victor Sorsoleil
 George Thomson
 Arthur Vigers
 Hazel Wallace
 Herbert Gilles Watson
 Noel Webb
 Thomas F. Williams
 Frederick C. Armstrong
 Charles C. Banks
 Reginald Brading
 Geoffrey Hornblower Cock
 Douglas Graham Cooke
 Sidney Cottle
 Wilfred A. Curtis
 Albert Enstone
 Gavin L. Graham
 Harold A. Hamersley
 Oscar Heron
 Spencer B. Horn
 George R. Howsam
 Ernest Charles Hoy
 Harold B. Hudson
 Solomon Clifford Joseph
 Ronald M. Keirstead
 John Letts
 Sydney Tyndall Liversedge
 William E. G. Mann
 John G. Manuel
 Wop May
 Thomas L. Purdom
 Francis James Ralph
 Harry Gosford Reeves
 George R. Riley
 Frederick Sowrey
 Stanley Stanger
 Eric John Stephens
 Francis S. Symondson
 John Howard Umney
 Desmond Uniacke
 Oliver H. D. Vickers
 David John Weston
 Walter Bertram Wood
 John Oliver Andrews
 Brian Edmund Baker
 Thomas Baker
 Gerald A. Birks
 Clement G. Boothroyd
 Quintin Brand
 Edwin C. Bromley
 Raymond Brownell
 Oliver Bryson
 Walter M. Carlaw
 Percival V. G. Chambers
 Edwin A. Clear
 Francis James Davies
 Frank Godfrey
 Ernest Hardcastle
 William Leeming Harrison
 William Henry Hubbard
 John E. L. Hunter
 Gordon Budd Irving
 William Stanley Jenkins
 George Hubert Kemp
 Gwilym Hugh Lewis
 Frederic Ives Lord
 Roby Lewis Manuel
 Roy Manzer
 Norman Mawle
 Douglas McGregor
 Kenneth Barbour Montgomery
 Josiah Lewis Morgan
 Ian Napier
 Walter Noble
 Guy William Price
 John Steele Ralston
 Henry Coyle Rath
 Cecil Roy Richards
 Alfred William Saunders
 James Scaramanga
 Maurice D. G. Scott
 Alexander MacDonald Shook
 Ross MacPherson Smith
 Reginald Soar
 William Samuel Stephenson
 Leonard Taplin
 Chester Thompson
 Adrian Tonks
 Richard M. Trevethan
 Melville Wells Waddington
 Dennis Waight
 James White
 Fred Everest Banbury
 Harold F. Beamish
 Alexander Beck
 Philip Scott Burge
 Arnold Jacques Chadwick
 Roy W. Chappell
 Hugh Claye
 Clive Franklyn Collett
 Thomas Colvill-Jones
 Hiram Frank Davison
 Harold Day
 William Duncan
 Trevor Durrant
 Thomas Elliott
 John C. B. Firth
 Henry Garnet Forrest
 William M. Fry
 Frederick J. Gibbs
 Charles D. B. Green
 Thomas M. Harries
 John Herbert Hedley
 Leslie Norman Hollinghurst
 Geoffrey H. Hooper
 Campbell Hoy
 Geoffrey Forrest Hughes
 Patrick Huskinson
 William Roy Irwin
 Mansell Richard James
 George Owen Johnson
 Arthur G. Jones-Williams
 Herbert Joseph Larkin
 Walter H. Longton
 Charles M. Maude
 Malcolm C. McGregor
 Finlay McQuistan
 James Hart Mitchell
 Sydney A. Oades
 Harold Anthony Oaks
 Herbert A. Patey
 Leonard A. Payne
 Clement W. Payton
 George E. Randall
 Hervey Rhodes
 Cyril Ridley
 Thomas Rose
 Ivan C. Sanderson
 John Stevenson Stubbs
 Albert Gregory Waller
 Arthur W. Wood
 Wilfred Ernest Young

10 victories (47 names)

 Laurence W. Allen
 Edgar O. Amm
 Gordon Apps
 Edward Dawson Atkinson
 Herbert H. Beddow
 Hilliard Brooke Bell
 Robert A. Birkbeck
 Lloyd S. Breadner
 Arthur Roy Brown
 Frederick Elliott Brown
 Sydney Carlin
 Robert L. Chidlaw-Roberts
 Adrian Cole
 Valentine Collins
 Jack Armand Cunningham
 Douglas Arthur Davies
 Edgar G. Davies
 Robert Dodds
 Aubrey Ellwood
 William H. Farrow
 Cecil Gardner
 Thomas Gerrard
 Gerald Gibbs
 Stanley Goble
 George Stacey Hodson
 Will Hubbard
 William Edward Jenkins
 Alfred Michael Koch
 Patrick Anthony Langan-Byrne
 John Joseph Malone
 Alfred E. McKay
 Guy Borthwick Moore
 Gordon Olley
 John Paynter
 Croye Pithey
 Arthur Randall
 Harold Redler
 Harry Robinson
 Indra Lal Roy
 John Rudkin
 Reginald H. Rusby
 Alfred Shepherd
 Saint Cyprian Tayler
 Frank Harold Taylor
 John Henry Tudhope
 William Lewis Wells
 Russell Winnicott

9 victories (80 names) 

 Cyril John Agelasto
 Charles Arnison
 Harold H. Balfour
 William Thomas Barnes
 Walter Beales
 Rex George Bennett
 James Binnie
 John Denis Breakey
 Frederick Britnell
 William Henry Brown
 George William Bulmer
 Francis Dominic Casey
 Thomas Cassady
 Leonard Arthur Christian
 Eric Douglas Cummings
 Donald Cunnell
 Hector Daniel
 George Darvill
 Richard Dawes
 Roger Del'Haye
 George Dixon
 John Doyle
 Christopher Draper
 Arthur Thomas Drinkwater
 James Henry Forman
 Frederick Gordon
 Robert MacIntyre Gordon
 Acheson Goulding
 William Edward Green
 George Hackwill
 James Hardman
 Frederick Hunt
 Reginald Johns
 Norman Cyril Jones
 Harold Spencer Kerby
 Leslie Walter King
 Francis Kitto
 Charles Lavers
 George V. Learmond
 James Leith Leith
 Selden Long
 Cyril Lowe
 Norman Macmillan
 Cecil Marchant
 Ronald Mauduit
 Reginald Maxwell
 John Sutholand McDonald
 Christopher McEvoy
 David MacKay McGoun
 Horace Merritt
 John Theobald Milne
 Basil Moody
 Richard Burnard Munday
 Charles Napier
 Ernest Norton
 Arthur Noss
 Conn Standish O'Grady
 Samuel Parry
 Edmond Pierce
 Frank Ransley
 Valentine Reed
 William Reed
 George Reid
 William Wendell Rogers
 Herbert Rowley
 Ernest James Salter
 Joseph Siddall
 Charles Sims
 Arthur Solly
 Anthony Spence
 Louis Mark Thompson
 Ronald Thornely
 Frederick Dudley Travers
 Ronald William Turner
 Guy Wareing
 Kenneth Bowman Watson
 Albert Edward Wear
 Thomas Williams
 Alec Williamson

8 victories (109 names)

 John William Aldred
 Gerald Frank Anderson
 Geoffrey Bailey
 Charles Bartlett
 Bernard Beanlands
 Donald Beard
 Edwin Benbow
 Maurice Benjamin
 Henry Biziou
 Gregory Blaxland
 Giles Blennerhasset
 Clive Brewster-Joske
 Edric Broadberry
 Alfred John Brown
 James Martin Child
 Robert David Coath
 Edwin Cole
 James Geoffrey Coombe
 Leslie Court
 William Craig
 Henry Crowe
 James Dawe
 John D. De Pencier
 Percy Douglas
 Peter Roy Maxwell Drummond
 Gordon Duncan
 William Durrand
 Harold E. Easton
 Leonard Herbert Emsden
 Harold Ross Eycott-Martin
 Garfield Finlay
 Desmond Fitzgibbon
 Austin Lloyd Fleming
 Cyril Gladman
 Clive Glynn
 James Grant
 Gilbert W. M. Green
 Eustace Grenfell
 Victor Groom
 Reuben Hammersley
 Frederick Harlock
 Herbert George Hegarty
 Alfred Hemming
 George Hicks
 D'Arcy Fowlis Hilton
 Ivan F. Hind
 William Norman Holmes
 Thomas Stanley Horry
 Richard Howard
 Hubert Hunt
 Ernest Graham Joy
 Kenneth William Junor
 Robert Kirby Kirkman
 Arthur Gerald Knight
 Sidney Knights
 Kenneth Leask
 Forde Leathley
 Cecil Arthur Lewis
 Alan Light
 George Lloyd
 Dudley Lloyd-Evans
 William Myron MacDonald
 William John MacKenzie
 Reginald Malcolm
 George Ivan Douglas Marks
 Ernest Masters
 M. B. Mather
 Hugh Maund
 John McCudden
 James McDonald
 Roderick McDonald
 Henry Meintjes
 Alexander W. Merchant
 Leslie Mitchell
 Henry Moody
 Joseph Michael John Moore
 Keith K. Muspratt
 Thomas Nash
 Eric Olivier
 William O'Toole
 Eric Pashley
 Arthur Peck
 Philip B. Prothero
 John Quested
 Lionel Rees
 Charles Robson
 William Rooper
 Alexander Roulstone
 William J. Rutherford
 Harold Satchell
 Franklin Saunders
 Owen Scholte
 Walter Scott
 Herbert Sellars
 John Edward Sharman
 George Simpson
 Robert Sloley
 John Henry Smith
 Langley Smith
 William Watson Smith
 Bertram Smyth
 John Summers
 Leslie Sutherland
 Clifford Tolman
 Thomas Traill
 John Warner
 Leslie Warren
 Claude Melnot Wilson
 William Wright

7 victories (133 names)

 Frank Alberry
 Charles Allen
 Ernest Antcliffe
 Lionel Ashfield
 Thomas Barkell
 John Bateman
 Alan Duncan Bell-Irving
 Thomas Birmingham
 William Harry Bland
 Cecil Brock
 George Ai Brooke
 Stanton Bunting
 David Luther Burgess
 Lynn Campbell
 Leslie Capel
 Robert Chandler
 Charles Chapman
 William Chisam
 Arthur Claydon
 Stanley Cockerell
 Arthur Cyril Cooper
 Arthur Gabbettis Cooper
 Sidney Cowan
 Roland Critchley
 Edward Crundall
 Alec Cunningham-Reid
 Rowan Daly
 Ernest Davies
 Ernest Davis
 James Dewhirst
 Roy Dodds
 Henry Dolan
 Thomas A. Doran
 Arthur Draisey
 Herbert Drewitt
 Cedric Edwards
 Herbert Ellis
 Conway Farrell
 George Buchanan Foster
 Gordon Fox-Rule
 Adrian Franklyn
 Maurice Freehill
 John Gamon
 Eric Gilroy
 Walter Grant
 William Edrington Gray
 Wilfred Green
 John Griffith
 Frederick Hall
 Herbert Hamilton
 Herbert Hartley
 Lanoe Hawker
 Ian Henderson
 William Carrall Hilborn
 Charles Hill
 Richard Frank Hill
 John Hills
 Edward Hoare
 Percy Hobson
 Jeffrey Batters Home-Hay
 Norman William Hustings
 Arthur Jarvis
 Louis Jarvis
 Archie Nathaniel Jenks
 Alan Jerrard
 Albert Leslie Jones
 George Jones
 Harold Joslyn
 Edward Patrick Kenney
 Walter Kirk
 Frederick John Knowles
 Maurice Le Blanc-Smith
 Arthur Lee
 Alfred Alexander Leitch
 Thomas Le Mesurier
 Hector MacDonald
 Peter MacDougall
 Norman MacGregor
 John MacKereth
 William MacLanachan
 Malcolm Plaw MacLeod
 Henry Maddocks
 Roy Kirkwood McConnell
 Paul McGinness
 Ernest Stanley Moore
 Ernest Morrow
 William Nel
 Charles Odell
 Augustus Orlebar
 Hugh Owen
 Robert Owen
 John Albert Page
 Arthur Palliser
 William Patrick
 William Pearson
 George Peters
 Frank Potter
 Stuart Harvey Pratt
 John Carberry Preston
 Stephen Price
 William Price
 Stanley Puffer
 Lewis Ray
 Lancelot Richardson
 James Robb
 Charles Robinson
 Howard Saint
 Douglas Savage
 Harry Scandrett
 Kenneth Gordon Seth-Smith
 Leonard Slatter
 Emerson Smith
 Frederick Stanton
 Charles Steele
 Charles Owen Stone
 Gilbert Strange
 Charles Stubbs
 Oliver Sutton
 Arthur Gilbert Vivian Taylor
 James Tennant
 David Tidmarsh
 William Tinsley
 Alexander Tranter
 Norman Trescowthick
 Francis Turner
 Awdry Vaucour
 Harold Walkerdine
 James Wellwood
 Harold Albert White
 Hugh White
 Percy Williams
 Percy Wilson
 Albert Woodbridge

6 victories (128 names)

 Ivan Agabeg
 Percival Appleby
 John Aspinall
 Robert Barbour
 John Barlow
 Frank Bell
 Eric Betts
 Nicholson Boulton
 Percy Boulton
 Clifford Bowman
 Arthur Britton
 Eric Brookes
 Leslie William Burbidge
 James Bush
 William Cairnes
 William Cambray
 John Candy
 Douglas Carbery
 Robert Chalmers
 Thomas Chiltern
 Henry Gordon Clappison
 Edward Clarke
 Harris George Clements
 John Henry Colbert
 Reginald Conder
 Gerald Kempster Cooper
 Maurice Cooper
 Irving Corey
 Earl Frederick Crabb
 Thomas Culling
 William Curphey
 John Daley
 Charles Dance
 Edward Darby
 Horace Balfour Davey
 Charles Davidson
 Horace Debenham
 John Elmer Drummond
 Denis Edwin Edgley
 Cyril Askew Eyre
 Robert Farquhar
 Daniel Galbraith
 George Gardiner
 Rupert Gifford
 George H. D. Gossip
 Herbert Gould
 James Green
 Duncan Grinnell-Milne
 Alfred Haines
 David S. Hall
 Stanley Hamblin
 Leslie Hamilton
 Geoffrey Hemming
 Cyril Heywood
 Walter G. R. Hinchliffe
 Philip Holligan
 Victor Huston
 Bruce Jackman
 H. S. Jackson
 Philip Andrew Johnston
 Noel Keeble
 Ernest Tilton Sumpter Kelly
 George Lawson
 Thomas Lewis
 H. Lindfield
 George Lingham
 Alwyne Travers Loyd
 Thomas Luke
 Andrew MacGregor
 Garnet Malley
 T. W. Martin
 F. H. Maynard
 Malcolm McCall
 Robert McKenzie
 Robert McLaughlin
 Oscar McMaking
 Leslie McRobert
 Earl Stanley Meek
 William Meggitt
 Frank Tremar Sibly Menendez
 William James Middleton
 Archibald Miller
 William Miller
 Norman Craig Millman
 Laurence Minot
 Hugh Fitzgerald Moore
 Gerald Ewart Nash
 Ernest Edward Owen
 Augustus Paget
 Medley Parlee
 Laurence Pearson
 Geoffrey Pidcock
 Sydney Pope
 Frederick Powell
 Thomas G. Rae
 Richard Raymond-Barker
 Alan Rice-Oxley
 Harry Rigby
 Cyril H. Sawyer
 Laurence Henry Scott
 Evander Shapard
 Thomas Sharpe
 Edward A. Simpson
 David Esplin Smith
 John Smith-Grant
 Cyril Richard Smythe
 Arthur Spurling
 William Strugnell
 Rothesay Stuart Wortley
 Ronald Sykes
 Harry Symons
 Cecil Thompson
 Claud Robert James Thompson
 Albert Tonkin
 James Hamilton Traill
 George Trapp
 Philip Tudhope
 Thomas Tuffield
 William Tyrell
 Eric Walker
 Bernard Albert Walkerdine
 Stephen Reginald Parke Walter
 Harry Watson
 William Westwood
 William A. Wheeler
 Victor White
 Frederick Wilton
 Harry Wood

5 victories (247 names)

 John Aldridge
 George Benson Anderson
 Arnold Ansell
 D'Urban Armstrong
 Anthony Arnold
 Thomas Henry Wright
 Edward Asbury
 Lionel Ashfield
 Rupert Atkinson
 Frank Babbage
 Lovell Baker
 Charles Gordon Bell
 William Benger
 Risdon Mackenzie Bennett
 Ronald Berlyn
 Frank Billinge
 Basil Blackett
 George Walker Blaiklock
 Arthur Winston Blake
 Alfred Blenkiron
 Charles Blizard
 William Otway Boger
 William Bond
 Edward Borgfeldt Booth
 Alan Bott
 William Bottrill
 Francis Bowles
 Godfrey Brembridge
 Orlando Bridgeman
 Allan Brown
 Sydney Brown
 John Bruce Norton
 Malcolm Burger
 Lawrence Callahan
 Douglas Cameron
 Edward Caulfield-Kelly
 Reginald Morse Charley
 James Child
 Alexander Goodlet Clark
 William Clarke
 Lewis Collins
 Harry Compton
 Everett Cook
 George J. Cox
 George Montague Cox
 Fergus Craig
 Kelvin Crawford
 Gerard Crole
 John Crompton
 Robert James Cullen
 Lumsden Cummings
 Frederick Cunninghame
 Sydney Dalrymple
 Charles Darwin
 Clive Davies
 Llewelyn Davies
 Miles Day
 Philip De Fontenay
 Bruno De Roeper
 Edward Barfoot Drake
 Chester S. Duffus
 William Dyke
 Arthur Easterbrook
 Edward Eaton
 Charles Eddy
 Herbert James Edwards
 Horace Eldon
 Hugh William Elliott
 William Elliott
 Sidney Emerson Ellis
 Henry Evans
 Ernest Foot
 George W. Furlow
 Hudson Fysh
 Richard Gammon
 James Victor Gascoyne
 George Gauld
 Dennis Henry Stacey Gilbertson
 Wilfred Bertie Giles
 John Gillanders
 William Gillespie
 William Gilson
 Harry Gompertz
 Michael Gonne
 Herbert Barrett Good
 Henry Goodison
 Kenneth Gopsill
 Richard Gordon-Bennett
 Ronald Graham
 Edward Grange
 Charles Gossage Grey
 Edward Gribben
 Hugh Griffith
 William Grossart
 John Playford Hales
 John Herbert Hall
 Robert Hall
 Joseph E. Hallonquist
 Arthur William Hammond
 Earl Hand
 James McKinley Hargreaves
 Howard Harker
 Arthur Travers Harris
 Charles Harrison
 William Harrop
 Edward Hartigan
 Hugh Hay
 Roger Hay
 Eustace Headlam
 Robert Herring
 George Frederick Hines
 William Hodgkinson
 Les Holden
 Robert Holme
 Percy Howe
 Malcolm Clifford Howell
 David Hughes
 Eric Yorath Hughes
 Thomas Hunter
 Cyril Edward Hurst
 George Hyde
 Arthur Gordon Jarvis
 Charles Jeffs
 Olaus Johnsen
 Percy Griffith Jones
 M. V. Kilroy
 James Knowles
 Frederick J. Kydd
 Kenneth Laing
 Conrad Lally
 David Langlands
 Sydney Frank Langstone
 James Latta
 Frederic Laurence
 James Lennox
 John Douglas Lightbody
 Ernest Lindup
 Robert Hazen Little
 George Lloyd
 John Lloyd Williams
 Reginald Lowe
 Charles Lupton
 Colin Glen Orr MacAndrew
 Ross Morrison MacDonald
 Harry MacKay
 Loudoun MacLean
 John Finley Noel MacRae
 Patrick Scarsfield Manley
 Leslie Morton Mansbridge
 William Stanley Mansell
 Stanley Masding
 Jack Mason
 William Drummond Matheson
 William Maxted
 Ronald McClintock
 George McCormack
 John McNeaney
 Russell Fern McRae
 Harold Medlicott
 Francis Mellersh
 Zenos Miller
 Kenneth Charles Mills
 Harold Molyneux
 John Towlson Morgan
 William John Mostyn
 Harold Edgar Mott
 Redford Mulock
 John Murison
 Donald Frederick Murmann
 Ernest Mustard
 Hugh Nangle
 Roger Neville
 Thomas Henry Newsome
 Percy Olieff
 Thomas Alfred Oliver
 Ernest Edward Owen
 John Sidney Owens
 Carrick Paul
 Edward Pennell
 Edmund Heaton Peverell
 Charles Pickthorn
 Gerald Pilditch
 Sidney Platel
 George Ramsden Poole
 Kenneth Porter
 Harold Johnstone Pratt
 Walbanke Ashby Pritt
 Thomas Proctor
 John Pugh
 Hartley Pullan
 W. C. Purvis
 Arthur Rullion Rattray
 John William Rayner
 Guy Reid
 Alan Incell Riley alias A. G. Riley
 Norman Roberts
 John Robertson
 John Russell
 William Sanday
 Robert Saundby
 Edward Sayers
 Alan John Lance Scott
 Joseph Powell Seabrook
 John Seerly
 Christopher Shannon
 Frank Sharpe
 Eric Landon Simonson
 Lambert Sloot
 Wallace Alexander Smart
 George Henry Benjamin Smith
 Harry Coleman Smith
 James Robert Smith
 Sydney Philip Smith
 William Thomas Smith
 Neil Smuts
 Wilfred Sneath
 Ian Oliver Stead
 Thomas Frederick Stephenson
 Frank Stevens
 Oliver Stewart
 Claud Stokes
 Edgar Taylor
 Patrick Gordon Taylor
 Meredith Thomas
 Anthony Joseph Hill Thornton
 Herbert Travers
 John Seymour Turnbull
 Arthur Henry Turner
 John Vessey
 Kenneth MacKenzie Walker
 William Walker
 John Wallwork
 Edward Henry Ward
 George Arthur Welsh
 Mortimer Sackville West
 Lewis Whitehead
 Charles Whitham
 Robert Kenneth Whitney
 Edward George Herbert Caradoc Williams
 Francis Jefferies Williams
 Cecil Frederick Charles Wilson
 Rupert Randolph Winter
 John Womersley
 Charles Woollven
 Charles Edward Worthington
 Victor Maslin Yeates
 Graham Conacher Young
 Edmund Leonard Zink

Notes

References

See also

World War I flying aces